Harry Ogden Crane (September 1, 1873 May 14, 1940) was an American silent film actor.

The son of concert singer Sarah Mundell Crane, he was married to Grace Benham.

Filmography

1910s
Caprice (1913)
Lord John's Journal (1915–1916; 5-film series) as Roger Odell
The Parson of Panamint (1916) as Absolom Randall
The Light of Western Stars (1918)
The Valley of the Giants (1919) as Mayor Poundstone

1920s

1920
Sic-Em  as Stephen Hamilton
Her Five-Foot Highness as Lesley Saunders
The Dwelling Place of Light as Chester Sprole
Wedding Blues
The Corsican Brothers

1921
The Greater Profit as Creightoon Hardage
See My Lawyer as T. Hamilton Brown
Southern Exposure
Oh Buddy!
The Invisible Fear (1921) as John Randall

1923
Navy Blues (1923)

References

External links
 
 
 
 

1873 births
1940 deaths
American male film actors
Male actors from New York City
American male silent film actors
20th-century American male actors